is a Japanese former professional baseball outfielder, and current forth squad outfield and base coach for the Fukuoka SoftBank Hawks of Nippon Professional Baseball (NPB).

He previously played for the Hanshin Tigers, the Seibu Lions, the Tohoku Rakuten Golden Eagles, and the Orix Buffaloes.

Professional career

Active player era
On November 20, 1993, Takanami was drafted third overall by the Hanshin Tigers in the  1993 Nippon Professional Baseball draft.

In 1995 season, He made his debut in the Central League, playing 52 games.

He played seven seasons with the Tigers and was traded to the Seibu Lions for the 2003 season.

Takanami then played four seasons with the Lions before moving to the Tohoku Rakuten Golden Eagles for two seasons and the Orix Buffaloes for one season.

Takanami then played four seasons with the Lions before moving to the Tohoku Rakuten Golden Eagles for two seasons and the Orix Buffaloes for one season, and he retired during the 2009 season.

He totaled 628 games in 13 seasons, with a .169 batting average, two home runs, 69 hitss, 26 RBI, and 59 stolen bases.

After retirement
After his retirement, Takanami joined the Fukuoka SoftBank Hawks farm team staff in the 2010 season and served as the outfield defense and base coach for the second and third squad in the 2012 season and the third squad in the 2013 season.

He also worked for the Hawks' Baseball Promotion Department from the 2014 to 2016 seasons and again from the 2017 to 2018 seasons as the third squad outfield defense and base coach.

From the 2019 season through the 2022 season he served as the assistant dormitory master for the Hawks players' dormitory　and rehabilitation staff in charge of fielders.

He will serve as the forth squad outfield defense and base coach beginning with the 2023 season.

References

External links

 Career statistics - NPB.jp 
 92 Fumikazu Takanami PLAYERS2018 - Fukuoka SoftBank Hawks Official site

1975 births
Living people
Japanese baseball players
Hanshin Tigers players
Seibu Lions players
Tohoku Rakuten Golden Eagles players
Orix Buffaloes players
Japanese baseball coaches
Nippon Professional Baseball outfielders
Baseball people from Kumamoto Prefecture